Erythrobacter longus is a species of bacteria, the genus' type species. It contains bacteriochlorophyll a. It is motile by means of subpolar flagella. Its type strain is OCh101 (= IFO 14126).

References

Further reading

External links

LPSN
WORMS entry
Type strain of Erythrobacter longus at BacDive -  the Bacterial Diversity Metadatabase

Sphingomonadales
Bacteria described in 1982